Nokia Navigator may refer to:
 Nokia 6110 Navigator
 Nokia 6210 Navigator
 Nokia 6710 Navigator